Cappe is a surname. Notable people with the surname include:

Catharine Cappe (1744–1821), British writer and philanthropist
Francesco Cappè (born 1971), Italian United Nations official
Jeanne Cappe (1895–1956), Belgian journalist and writer
Mel Cappe (born 1948), Canadian civil servant and diplomat
Newcome Cappe (1733–1800), English unitarian
Noah Cappe (born 1977), Canadian actor and television presenter

See also